Apache Bloodhound is an open source web-based project management and bug tracking system. The program is built on top of Trac. It is developed and maintained by volunteers at the Apache Software Foundation. 

The Bloodhound project was initially submitted to the Apache Incubator by WANdisco after integration with an issue tracker was the most requested feature for uberSVN. Bloodhound graduated from the incubator on 2013-03-20 and became an Apache Top Level Project.

As of August 27, 2019, Bloodhound is still available for download at the usual Apache mirror sites, but all of the support links to live.bloodhound.apache.org fail as unreachable. The Bloodhound project management committee voted unanimously on June 15, 2016, to shut down the project, but the board tabled the issue. Apache currently supports a similar product Apache Allura.

Bloodhound is written in the Python programming language and released under the Apache Software License.

Features 
The software inherits features from Trac and initially set out to resolve three long-standing requests with Trac: management of multiple projects, ease of installation, ease of use and also supports embedding of Google gadgets.

In addition Bloodhound has integrated the Python library Whoosh in version 0.5, providing full text search and search navigation by facets and incorporate many plugins optional in Trac out of the box.

See also 

 Comparison of project management software
 Comparison of issue-tracking systems
 Software configuration management
 Apache Allura
 Kallithea

References

External links 
 

Bloodhound
Free project management software
Free software programmed in Python
Free wiki software
Bug and issue tracking software
Cross-platform free software
2012 software